UbuWeb is a web-based educational resource for avant-garde material available on the internet, founded in 1996 by poet Kenneth Goldsmith. It offers visual, concrete and sound poetry, expanding to include film and sound art mp3 archives.

Philosophy

UbuWeb was founded in response to the marginal distribution of crucial avant-garde material. It remains non-commercial and operates on a gift economy. UbuWeb ensures educational open access to out-of-print works that find a second life through digital art reprint while also representing the work of contemporaries. It addresses problems in the distribution of and access to intellectual materials.

Distribution policy

UbuWeb does not distribute commercially viable works but rather resurrects avant-garde sound art, video and textual works through their translation into a digital art web environment - re-contextualising them with current academic commentary and contemporary practice. It houses and distributes freely the entire archive of the Tellus Audio Cassette Magazine project. In 2020, Kenneth Goldsmith wrote in his book Duchamp Is My Lawyer: The Polemics, Pragmatics, and Poetics of Ubuweb that “Perhaps no collection of audio inspired UbuWeb more than the Tellus cassettes….”

Content

Beyond its repository of works, UbuWeb features curated sections including /ubu Editions book-length editions of contemporary poetry, selected and introduced by the poet Brian Kim Stefans. UbuWeb: Ethnopoetics, curated by Jerome Rothenberg, is fusing the avant-garde with traditional ethnic practices. UbuWeb: Papers is a series of contextual academic essays. UbuWeb:Outsiders considers the legitimization of Outsider works and features The 365 Days Project curated by Otis Fodder.

Infrastructure

UbuWeb is not affiliated to any academic institution, instead relying on alliances of interest and benefiting from bandwidth donations from its partnerships with GreyLodge, WFMU, PennSound, The Electronic Poetry Center, The Center for Literary Computing, and ArtMob.

References

External links 
UbuWeb
Damon Krukowski, "Free Verses: Kenneth Goldsmith and UbuWeb", Artforum, March 2008
Kenneth Goldsmith: "UbuWeb Wants to be Free"
Kenneth Goldsmith: "If It Doesn't Exist on the Internet, It Doesn't Exist"

Experimental film
Internet properties established in 1996
American literature websites
Non-profit organizations based in the United States
Art websites
Audiovisual ephemera
Arts organizations established in 1996